Maud is an unincorporated community in Stevens County, in the U.S. state of Washington.

History
A post office called Maud was established in 1904, and remained in operation until 1914. The community was named after Maud Morgan, the child of an early settler.

References

Unincorporated communities in Stevens County, Washington
Unincorporated communities in Washington (state)